, there were around 11,000 electric vehicles registered in the Czech Republic, equivalent to 0.1% of all vehicles in the country. , 4% of new cars registered in the Czech Republic were electric or plug-in hybrid.

, the Škoda Enyaq was the best-selling electric car in the Czech Republic.

Government policy
, the Czech government does not offer any tax incentives for individuals to purchase electric vehicles.

Charging stations
, there were 465 public charging stations in the Czech Republic operated by ČEZ Group.

Manufacturing
, around 10% of cars manufactured in the Czech Republic were electric.

References

Czech Republic
Road transport in the Czech Republic